museum is a sponsored top-level domain (sTLD) in the Domain Name System of the Internet used exclusively by museums, museum associations, and individual members of the museum profession, as these groups are defined by the International Council of Museums (ICOM).

In joint action with the J. Paul Getty Trust, ICOM established the Museum Domain Management Association (MuseDoma), headed by Cary Karp, for the purpose of submitting an application to ICANN for the creation of the new generic top-level domain (gTLD), and to operate a registry. The  domain was entered into the DNS root on 20 October 2001, and was the first sponsored top-level domain to be instituted through ICANN's action.

The purpose of this domain is to reserve a segment of the DNS name space reserved for the use of museums; a name space whose conventions are defined by the museum community.  The  TLD grants users a quick and intuitive way to verify the authenticity of a museum site.  Conversely, since it is a type of formal third-party certification, museums using this name space obtain a way to assure visitors of the site's validity.

One of the initial ideas with the  tld was to create a network of official museum websites, and operate a central indexing tool to make all of their hosted content searchable, discoverable.

In addition to the eligibility requirements specified in the  charter, naming conventions apply to the labeling of subdomains.

Registrations are processed via accredited registrars.

See also 
 Museum Domain Management Association

References

External links
 About .museum website
 .museum policies
 Index of names in .museum
 MuseDoma website

Computer-related introductions in 2001
Sponsored top-level domains

International Council of Museums
Museum informatics

sv:Toppdomän#Generiska toppdomäner